Frédéric Dindeleux (born 16 January 1974) is a French former professional footballer who played as a defender. Dindeleux played for Lille, Kilmarnock, Zulte Waregem, Oostende and K.M.S.K. Deinze.

Career
After six years with French club Lille OSC, Dindeleux joined Scottish club Kilmarnock under the Bosman ruling. Dindeleux, known affectionately by the fans as "Freddie", was one of Kilmarnock's most popular players between 1999 and 2005. He was attracted to the club by the prospect of playing in the UEFA Cup with Kilmarnock, as well as regular first team football. Dindeleux went on to play over 200 games for Kilmarnock, and signed two contract extensions in that time. He is fondly remembered by Kilmarnock fans for his confident and uncompromising style.

References

External links

France Football N°2627, 2678, 2731, 2782

Living people
1974 births
French footballers
Footballers from Lille
Association football defenders
Ligue 1 players
Scottish Premier League players
Lille OSC players
Kilmarnock F.C. players
S.V. Zulte Waregem players
K.V. Oostende players
K.M.S.K. Deinze players
French expatriate footballers
French expatriate sportspeople in Scotland
Expatriate footballers in Scotland
French expatriate sportspeople in Belgium
Expatriate footballers in Belgium